Mundie is a surname. Notable people with the surname include:
Craig Mundie (born 1949), American technology businessman
J. Norman Mundie (1929–2013), American politician from Iowa

See also
Mundie & Jensen, defunct architecture firm in Chicago